Eger is a district in eastern part of Heves County. Eger is also the name of the town where the district seat is found. The district is located in the Northern Hungary Statistical Region. This district lies between of Bükk Mountains and Mátra Mountains geographical region.

Geography 
Eger District borders with Bélapátfalva District to the north, Mezőkövesd District (Borsod-Abaúj-Zemplén County) to the east, Füzesabony District to the south, Gyöngyös District and Pétervására District to the west. The number of the inhabited places in Eger District is 22.

Municipalities 
The district has 1 urban county, 1 town and 20 villages.
(ordered by population, as of 1 January 2012)

The bolded municipalities are cities.

Demographics

In 2011, it had a population of 87,939 and the population density was 146/km².

Ethnicity
Besides the Hungarian majority, the main minorities are the Roma (approx. 4,000), German (600), Romanian (150) and Slovak (100).

Total population (2011 census): 87,939
Ethnic groups (2011 census): Identified themselves: 80,504 persons:
Hungarians: 74,703 (92.79%)
Gypsies: 3,712 (4.61%)
Others and indefinable: 2,089 (2.59%)
Approx. 7,500 persons in Eger District did not declare their ethnic group at the 2011 census.

Religion
Religious adherence in the county according to 2011 census:

Catholic – 40,397 (Roman Catholic – 39,948; Greek Catholic – 441);
Reformed – 5,241;
Evangelical – 281; 
other religions – 1,501; 
Non-religious – 13,897; 
Atheism – 1,465;
Undeclared – 25,157.

Gallery

See also
List of cities and towns of Hungary

References

External links
 Postal codes of the Eger District

Districts in Heves County